Lin Ming-hsien (born 29 March 1977 in Taiwan) is a Taiwanese baseball player who played for the Brother Elephants of the Chinese Professional Baseball League. He played as left outfielder.

Career statistics

See also
 Chinese Professional Baseball League
 Brother Elephants

References

External links
 

1977 births
Living people
Brother Elephants players
Baseball players from Tainan